Forsand Church is a parish church of the Church of Norway in the eastern part of the large Sandnes Municipality in Rogaland county, Norway. It is located in the village of Forsand, near the mouth to the Lysefjorden. It is one of the two churches for the Forsand parish which is part of the Sandnes prosti (deanery) in the Diocese of Stavanger. The white, wooden church was built in a long church design in 1854 by the builder Tollak Tollaksen Gudmestad using plans drawn up by the architect Hans Linstow. The church seats about 300 people.

History

In 1854, the new parish of Forsand was approved. Construction on the new church began on 13 May 1854, shortly before the government approved the new church. The church was consecrated on 10 October 1854 by the Bishop Jacob von der Lippe.  In 1963, the choir was expanded, the pulpit was lowered, and the floor was raised and insulated. The church also received electric heating. On 19 June 2016, a large triangular addition to the church was completed on the south side of the church, adding bathrooms, small group rooms, a chapel, and a kitchen.

See also
List of churches in Rogaland

References

Sandnes
Churches in Rogaland
Wooden churches in Norway
19th-century Church of Norway church buildings
Churches completed in 1854
1854 establishments in Norway